"Funk You Up" is a 1979 old school hip hop song recorded by the Sequence for Sugar Hill Records. It is significant as the first hip-hop song to be released by a female rap group (and by a rap group from the Southern United States, as all three members of The Sequence were natives of Columbia, South Carolina), and was the second single released on Sugar Hill, following "Rapper's Delight" by the Sugarhill Gang.

Sampling
The opening guitar and synth-drums were sampled in Organized Rhyme's single, "Check the O.R." Dr. Dre used interpolations for his 1995 hit "Keep Their Heads Ringin'".  In 2003, a semi-remake entitled "Love of My Life Worldwide" appeared on Erykah Badu's album, Worldwide Underground. Erykah Badu's version contained rap vocals from herself, Queen Latifah, Bahamadia and Angie Stone a.k.a. the Sequence's Angie B in her later R&B persona.

In 1997, En Vogue sampled the song on their remix of "Whatever" featuring Ol' Dirty Bastard.

In 2016, the Sequence claimed that Mark Ronson's "Uptown Funk" infringed their single "Funk You Up". They decided to sue a year later.

In 2022, Katy Perry did an advertisement for food delivery service Just Eat which interpolated "Funk You Up" (There were alternative versions for the Menulog and SkipTheDishes adverts).

References

1979 songs
1979 debut singles
American hip hop songs
Sugar Hill Records (Hip-Hop label) singles
Songs written by Angie Stone
Songs written by Sylvia Robinson